Dave Fleming (March 9, 1944 – April 22, 2020) was a Canadian football player who played for the Hamilton Tiger-Cats. He won the Grey Cup with them in 1965, 1967 and 1972. He played college football at the University of Pittsburgh.

References

1944 births
2020 deaths
Players of Canadian football from Pittsburgh
Players of American football from Pittsburgh
Hamilton Tiger-Cats players
Pittsburgh Panthers football players
Canadian football running backs